Festa is the third studio album released by Brazilian singer Ivete Sangalo, released on December 5, 2001.

Track listing

Certifications

References 

2001 albums
Ivete Sangalo albums
Universal Music Group albums